In cryptography, a distributed point function is a cryptographic primitive that allows two distributed processes to share a piece of information, and compute functions of their shared information, without revealing the information itself to either process. It is a form of secret sharing.

Given any two values  and  one can define a point function  (a variant of the Kronecker delta function) by

where  denotes the bitwise exclusive or of the two function values.

It is known  how to construct an efficient distributed point function from another cryptographic primitive, a one-way function.

In the other direction, if a distributed point function is known, then it is possible to perform private information retrieval.
As a simplified example of this, it is possible to test whether a key  belongs to replicated distributed database without revealing to the database servers (unless they collude with each other) which key was sought. The two returned  values will differ if  belongs to the database, and will be equal otherwise.

References

Cryptographic primitives